Balugaon is a town in Khordha district in the state of Odisha, India. It is a major economic centre of Khordha district because of its prawn and fish business.

Geography

Communication
Balugaon is well connected to state capital Bhubaneswar and  Berhampur by road (NH16) and rail. Balugaon railway station on the Howrah-Chennai main line connects Balugaon to major Indian cities like Kolkata, Chennai and Visakhapatnam. All major trains passing through this line stop at Balugaon. Jagannath Dham Puri can be reached via New Jagannath Sadak.

Tourism
Major tourist spota at Chilika lake like Kalijai Temple and Nalabana can be reached from Balugaon with government or private boat and launch services. Narayani Temple is a few miles from Balugaon and is famous for its natural scenic beauty. There is a natural fountain near Ranpur.

Demographics
In the 2001 India census, Balugaon had a population of 15,824 (males 53%, females 47%). Balugaon had an average literacy rate of 67%, higher than the national average of 59.5%, with 59% of the males and 41% of females literate. 14% of the population were under 6 years of age.

References

External links

Cities and towns in Khordha district